Roland Mursits (born 14 March 1991) is a Hungarian football player who plays for Haladás.

Club career
In June 2022, Mursits returned to Haladás.

References

External links
HLSZ
MLSZ

1991 births
Sportspeople from Szombathely
21st-century Hungarian people
Living people
Hungarian footballers
Hungary youth international footballers
Hungary under-21 international footballers
Association football goalkeepers
Szombathelyi Haladás footballers
Békéscsaba 1912 Előre footballers
Ceglédi VSE footballers
Dorogi FC footballers
Nemzeti Bajnokság I players
Nemzeti Bajnokság II players